The Worm is an album by American jazz organist Jimmy McGriff featuring performances recorded in 1968 and originally released on the Solid State label.

Reception
The Allmusic review by Thom Jurek stated "The Worm is a monster album through and through. Not only is it a revelatory example of McGriff on the wild, it marks one of the first places where the new funky urban soul met jazz and blues and evolved into jazz-funk".

Track listing
All compositions by Jimmy McGriff except as indicated
 "The Worm" (Sonny Lester, Jimmy McGriff, Fats Theus) - 3:20
 "Keep Loose" - 5:56
 "Heavyweight" - 6:52	
 "Think" (Aretha Franklin, Ted White) - 3:16
 "Lock It Up" (Kenny Burrell) - 5:13
 "Girl Talk" (Neal Hefti, Bobby Troup) - 4:31
 "Blue Juice" - 4:59
 "Take the "A" Train" (Billy Strayhorn) - 3:46

Personnel
Jimmy McGriff - organ
Blue Mitchell - trumpet
Danny Turner - alto saxophone
Fats Theus - tenor saxophone
Robert Ashton - baritone saxophone
Thornel Schwartz - guitar
Bob Bushnell - electric bass
Mel Lewis, Grady Tate - drums

References

Solid State Records (jazz label) albums
Blue Note Records albums
Jimmy McGriff albums
1968 albums
Albums produced by Sonny Lester